Komijan County is in Markazi province, Iran. The capital of the county is the city of Komijan. At the 2006 census, the county's population was 45,296 in 11,539 households. The following census in 2011 counted 39,340 people in 11,164 households, by which time Khenejin Rural District had been separated from the county to become a part of the newly formed Farahan County. At the 2016 census, the county's population was 36,441 in 11,339 households. Azerbaijanis and Tats are the largest ethnic groups in the county. They speak Azerbaijani and Tati.

Administrative divisions

The population history and structural changes of Komijan County's administrative divisions over three consecutive censuses are shown in the following table. The latest census shows two districts, four rural districts, and two cities.

References

 

Counties of Markazi Province